The 2012–13 Eredivisie was the 57th season of Eredivisie, since its establishment in 1955. It began on 10 August 2012 with the first match of the season and ended on 26 May 2013, with the last matches of the European competition and relegation play-offs. This is the first time VAR has been used for testing.

Teams

A total of 18 teams took part in the league: The best fifteen teams from the 2011–12 season, two promotion/relegation playoff winners and the 2011–12 Eerste Divisie champions.

Personnel and kits

Note: Flags indicate national team as has been defined under FIFA eligibility rules. Players and Managers may hold more than one non-FIFA nationality.

Managerial changes

League table

Results

Play-offs

European competition
The teams placed fifth through eighth competed in a play-off tournament for one spot in the second qualifying round of the 2013–14 UEFA Europa League. Teams on the left played the first leg at home.

Semi-finals
The first legs were played on 16 May 2013, while the return legs were played on 19 May 2013.

Finals

Relegation
Roda JC and VVV-Venlo joined the Eerste Divisie-teams for the play-offs, after finishing 16th and 17th in the Eredivisie.

Round 1

Round 2

Round 3

Season statistics

Top scorers

References

External links
 

Eredivisie seasons
Netherlands
1